Bronk or Bronck may refer to:

 Jonas Bronck (1600–1643), Swedish immigrant who gave his name to The Bronx
 Pieter Bronck, son or brother of Jonas Bronck
 Bronck House, historic landmark home of Pieter Bronck
 Deborah Bronk, American oceanographer
 Detlev Wulf Bronk (1897–1975), president of Johns Hopkins University
 Isabelle Bronk (1858–1943), American professor of French
 Benjy Bronk, American producer and comedian
 Bronk (crater), a crater on the far side of the Moon
 Calgary Bronks, Canadian Football team now known as the Calgary Stampeders
 Bronk (TV series), a 1975 TV series
 William Bronk, American poet and National Book Award winner for Life Supports

See also

 Pronk (disambiguation)